McMahan is a surname. Notable people with the surname include:

Alan McMahan, Christian theologian
Brian McMahan (born 1969), American guitarist
Chad McMahan, American politician.
Jack McMahan (1932–2020), American baseball player
Jeff McMahan (philosopher) (born 1954), American philosopher
Jeff McMahan (politician), American politician
Kevin McMahan (born 1983), American football player
Mickey McMahan (1930–2008), American trumpeter
Mike McMahan, American comedy writer
Robert McMahan (born 1961), American physicist and university president
Ronnie McMahan (born 1972), American basketball player
W. Edwin McMahan (born 1944), American politician

See also
McMahan Mound Site, an archaeological site in Sevierville, Tennessee, United States
McMahan Homestead, historic home in Chautauqua County, New York, United States
McMahan, Texas, an unincorporated community in Caldwell County, Texas, United States
McMahen
McMahon
McMann